The Altai gas pipeline (also known as Power of Siberia 2) is a proposed natural gas pipeline to export natural gas from Russia's Western Siberia to North-Western China.

History
The memorandum on deliveries of Russian natural gas to China was signed by Gazprom CEO Alexei Miller and CNPC CEO Chen Geng during Russian president Vladimir Putin's visit to China in March 2006.  The project was put on hold due to disagreements over natural gas price and competition from other gas sources in the Chinese market.

In 2013, Gazprom and CNPC agreed to instead pursue a more eastern route, the Power of Siberia gas pipeline. In 2014, the project was resumed during the APEC summit. In 2015, the project was "postponed for an indefinite period of time".

Gazprom and the Mongolian Government discussed details of a feasibility study for the Power of Siberia 2 pipeline project in October 2021. In 2022, Mongolia’s Prime Minister Oyun-Erdene Luvsannamsrai announced that the feasibility study has been completed, and that the construction of the pipeline will commence in 2024, and will connect the Siberian gas fields to China via Mongolia.

Route
The  pipeline would start from the Purpeyskaya compressor station of the existing Urengoy–Surgut–Chelyabinsk pipeline. It would carry natural gas from the Nadym and Urengoy fields in Western Siberia. The terminal point in the Russian territory is the Kanas mountain pass. A large part of the pipeline will be built within the technical corridor of existing pipelines, such as the Urengoy—Surgut—Chelyabinsk, Northern Tyumen–Surgut—Omsk, Nizhnevartovsk gas refinery – Parabel, Parabel—Kuzbass, Novosibirsk—Kuzbass, Novosibirsk—Barnaul, and Barnaul—Biysk pipelines. In China, the pipeline would be terminated in the Xinjiang region, where it will be linked to the West–East Gas Pipeline. 

Alternatively, an eastern route through Mongolia is being studied.

Technical description
The diameter of the pipeline would be . The designed capacity of the pipeline would be 30 billion cubic meters (bcm) natural gas annually and the total costs of the whole project is expected to be up to US$14 billion. The pipeline was originally expected to become operational in 2011.  The pipeline will be built and operated by TomskTransGaz, the subsidiary of Gazprom.

Controversy
The pipeline project has been criticized by environmental organizations because it was planned to run across the Ukok Plateau, which is the natural habitat of the snow leopard and other endangered species. Additionally, Altai leaders feared that construction of the pipeline and accompanying technical highway will pave the way for a Chinese expansion into Altai. The pipeline route impacts burial sites and shrines in the region.

References

External links

 Altai Project (Gazprom website)
 А.Н. Рудой. "Обратная сторона Луны?"

Natural gas pipelines in Russia
Natural gas pipelines in China
Proposed pipelines in Asia
Gazprom pipelines
China–Russia relations